The Mahia whiptail,  large-headed whiptail, or Mahia rattail, Coelorinchus matamua, is a species of rattail found circumpolar in the southern oceans, at depths of between 450 and 1,000 m.  Its length is between 45 and 65 cm.

References
 
 Tony Ayling & Geoffrey Cox, Collins Guide to the Sea Fishes of New Zealand,  (William Collins Publishers Ltd, Auckland, New Zealand 1982) 

Macrouridae
Fish described in 1980